Santa Anna High School is a public high school located in Santa Anna, Texas, United States and classified as a 1A school by the University Interscholastic League (UIL). It is part of the Santa Anna Independent School District located in central Coleman County. In 2015, the school was rated "Met Standard" by the Texas Education Agency.

Athletics
The Santa Anna Mountaineers compete in these sports - 

Basketball
Cross Country
6-Man Football
Softball
Tennis
Track and Field

See also
List of Six-man football stadiums in Texas

References

External links
Santa Anna ISD
Six Man Football

Schools in Coleman County, Texas
Public high schools in Texas
Public middle schools in Texas